The Greek Tjeld type patrol boats were a set of six fast patrol boats built to a Norwegian design and operated by the Hellenic Navy during the 1960s and early 1970s.

Construction
The six vessels were built by the Norwegian company Westermoen of Mandal, Norway, to the same design as that of the Tjeld class patrol boats built by Westermoen for the Royal Norwegian Navy in 1959. This was in turn based on their prototype fast patrol boat, the Nasty, and the Greek vessels are also described as the "Improved Nasty type". Other sources give the names "Nasty-type" and "Nasty-class" patrol boats.

The vessels were ordered in 1965, identical to the Tjeld boats except they had two 40mm guns instead of the single 40mm and 20mm guns of the Tjeld boats. They were delivered in 1967, and commissioned with astronomical names. They were the first warships built for the Greek navy since the 1930s.

Service history 
The six vessels remained in service until the 1980s. In 1982 Iniohos was discarded and the remaining vessels were re-numbered P196-200 (inclusive); all were decommissioned and placed in reserve or sold in 1983.
 
In 1989 four boats were re-engined and re-activated, but by 1985 all had been disposed of.

List of vessels

Notes
Toxotis,Andromeda,Kiknos and Pigasos are still in service at Patrol duty at Eastern Aegean islands.Re-engined with 2 MTU each and 2 fiat iveco engines using as armament only 1 40mm boffors and 1 20mm Oerlikon.No torpedo tubes in usage at the moment

References
 Gardiner, Robert; Chumbley, Stephen Conway's All The World's Fighting Ships 1947–1995 (1995) Naval Institute Press, Annapolis 
 Miller, David The World's Navies: an illustrated review of the navies of the world (1992) Crescent Books,

External links
 fast boats command -history at hellenic navy.gr
https://www.hellenicnavy.gr/en/fleet/patrol-boats2/toksotis.html

Patrol boat classes
Torpedo boats of the Hellenic Navy
Napier Deltic
Ships built in Mandal, Norway